Gazaria may refer to several places:

Bangladesh
 Gazaria Union
 Gazaria Upazila

Crimea
 Perateia (Perateian Gazaria), medieval Crimea
 Gazaria (Genoese colonies), medieval Genoese colonies on the Black Sea in the former Khazaria
 Principality of Theodoro (Theodorite Gazaria), a Gotho-Byzantine state in the medieval Crimea